Corophiidira is a parvorder of marine amphipod crustaceans in the infraorder Corophiida.  In a previous classification, this taxon was treated as an infraorder and was then itself called Corophiida.

Families
The group contains six families classified into four superfamilies.

Superfamily Aoroidea Stebbing, 1899
Aoridae Stebbing, 1899
Unciolidae Myers & Lowry, 2003
Superfamily Cheluroidea Allman, 1847
Cheluridae Allman, 1847
Superfamily Chevalioidea Myers & Lowry, 2003
Chevaliidae Myers & Lowry, 2003
Superfamily Corophioidea Leach, 1814
Ampithoidae Boeck, 1871
Corophiidae Leach, 1814

References

External links

Corophiidea